This is a list of notable Taiwanese desserts and snacks. Some of these dishes are also a part of other cuisines.

Taiwanese desserts and snacks

See also

 List of desserts
 Taiwanese cuisine

References

 
Taiwanese